Gerald LeRoy Lacy (born March 27, 1936) is an American soap opera actor best known for playing the roles of Tony Peterson, Reverend Trask, Reverend Gregory Trask, Mr. Trask, and Lamar Trask on the TV serial Dark Shadows.  He has also appeared on The Secret Storm, As the World Turns (as Simon Gilbey),  Love of Life (as Rick Latimer), and The Young and the Restless (as Jonas).

Life and career
Lacy was born in Sioux City, Iowa. He played Humphrey Bogart in both the Broadway show and film version of Woody Allen's Play It Again, Sam. During the 1970s Lacy appeared in the films House of Dark Shadows, The Money, and Blood Bath.  His other film roles include The Big G and Imps*, as well as the  TV films Pleasure Cove, Fighting Back, and Chiller. Lacy  was offered the role of Rev. Trask in the second film based on Dark Shadows, Night of Dark Shadows,  but at the time he was under contract with As the World Turns and his schedule on the show was too heavy for him to shoot the film.

He has been married to actress Julia Duffy since 1984. The couple met when they were both appearing on the CBS soap opera Love of Life.  In the 1990s he appeared with his wife on the series Designing Women, as her character's (Allison Sugarbaker) ex-fiancé, Barry, who dumped her at the altar; and in 2005, in an episode of Drake & Josh (which aired in 2006), he appeared as Duffy's character's  (Alice Hayfer) husband.  He also wrote one of the episodes of Duffy's other comedy series, Newhart.

In the summer of 1970, Lacy was a regular on the CBS summer replacement series, Comedy Tonight, and later a similar show, 20th Century Follies. He has guest-starred in a number of primetime shows, including McCloud, Eight is Enough, The White Shadow, Knots Landing, Hardball, and Saved by the Bell.

He returned to the role of Gregory Trask in the Dark Shadows audio dramas The Wicked and the Dead (2009) and Kingdom of the Dead (2010).

In mid-2010, Lacy sat for an exclusive interview with freelance writer (and Dark Shadows fan) Rod Labbe. Entitled "Saints and Sinners", it ran in the September 2010 edition of Fangoria magazine. Labbe and Lacy collaborated again on a lengthier interview for Scary Monsters Magazine. The issue, #90, was released in December 2013, and the interview is entitled "Right for the Part". Also in 2013, Lacy reunited with his Dark Shadows costars Lara Parker and Kathryn Leigh Scott for the feature film Doctor Mabuse, written and directed by Ansel Faraj. Lacy starred as the titular doctor, reprising his role in Doctor Mabuse: Etiopomar, released in 2014.

Personal life
Lacy married actress Julia Duffy in 1984. In 1986, they had their first child, a daughter, Kerry. In August 1989, Duffy gave birth to their second child, a son, Daniel. Daniel died by suicide in April 2019.

References

External links

1936 births
20th-century American male actors
21st-century American male actors
Actors from Sioux City, Iowa
American male stage actors
American male film actors
American male soap opera actors
American male television actors
Living people
Male actors from Iowa